= Jeremy Vanderloop =

American Christian musician (born 1988)

- Born: Jeremy Shawn Vanderloop; April 28, 1988 (age 38)
- Origin: Clearwater, Florida
- Genres: Worship, Christian pop, Christian rock, indie rock
- Occupations: Singer, songwriter
- Instrument: vocals
- Years active: 2010–present
- Website: jeremyvanderloop.com

Jeremy Shawn Vanderloop (born April 28, 1988) is an American Christian musician, who primarily plays indie rock music. He has released three studio album, The Rescue (2010), All Creation Sings (2012), and No Death (2016). Vanderloop released an extended play, Love Is in the Air, in 2011.

== Early and background ==
Jeremy Shawn Vanderloop was born on April 28, 1988, and he was raised in Clearwater, Florida.

== Music history ==
His music career began in 2010, with the studio album, The Rescue, on May 4, 2010. The subsequent release, an extended play, Love Is in the Air, was released in 2011. He released, All Creation Sings, on October 2, 2012, with Mosaic Artistry Group.

== Discography ==
Studio albums

- The Rescue (May 4, 2010)
- All Creation Sings (October 2, 2012, Mosaic Artistry)
- No Death (April 29, 2016)

EPs

- Love Is in the Air (April 12, 2011)
